Pterothysanus pictus is a moth of the  family Callidulidae. It is found in Madagascar.

Common colors are black and white. It has a wingspan of 60mm.

References

Callidulidae
Moths described in 1884
Lepidoptera of Madagascar
Moths of Madagascar
Moths of Africa